Gorizia is a city in northern Italy.

Gorizia may also refer to:
 Province of Gorizia, the province of the Friuli–Venezia Giulia region
 County of Gorizia, historical province
 Italian cruiser Gorizia, World War II heavy cruiser
 (7675) Gorizia, a main-belt asteroid